SC2 may refer to:

South Carolina Highway 2, a state route in Cayce, South Carolina
, a United States Navy submarine chaser commissioned in 1918 and sold in 1930
Saturn SC2, a compact sport coupe car
 Convoy SC 2, an Allied trade convoy that was attacked during the Second World War
 ISO/IEC JTC 1/SC 2, standardization subcommittee for coded character sets
 SC2 (leisure complex), in Rhyl
 SC02, a FIPS 10-4 region code, see List of FIPS region codes (S–U)
 SC-02, a subdivision code for the Seychelles, see ISO 3166-2:SC
 SC-02, a speech synthesizer by Votrax

Film 
Santa Clause 2, the 2002 sequel to the original Santa Clause film
Short Circuit 2, a 1988 American film

Video games 
SimCity 2000, a city-building game
Soulcalibur II, a fighting game for several video game consoles
Tom Clancy's Splinter Cell: Pandora Tomorrow, previously called Splinter Cell 2
Star Control II, a science fiction computer game
StarCraft II, a real-time strategy game by Blizzard Entertainment
Supreme Commander 2, a real-time strategy video game

See also
 SCC (disambiguation)
 SCSC (disambiguation)